is a passenger railway station located in the city of Nagahama, Shiga Prefecture, Japan, operated by West Japan Railway Company (JR West).

Lines
Between 1991 and 2006, the station was the dividing point of electrification systems (south of the station, including the station, was 1500 V DC and north was 20,000 V AC) so that all regional trains from Osaka and Kyoto using DC-only electric multiple units terminated at this station. In 2006 the DC zone was extended to Tsuruga Station, but there still exist some terminating trains at Nagahama.

Station layout
The station consists of one side platform and one island platform with an elevated station building located above the platforms. The island platform has a cut-out, allowing part of the platform to serve an additional track. The station has a Midori no Madoguchi staffed ticket office.

Platforms

History
Nagahama Station opened on March 10, 1882 under the Japanese Government Railway (JGR). Until 1889 when the Tōkaidō Main Line was completed by the opening of the last section in Shiga Prefecture, Nagahama was a connection point of the railway and the boat on the Biwa Lake which fulfilled the gap of the railways east and west of the lake. The original station, built 1882, is now preserved as a museum (The Old Nagahama Station Museum), and is the oldest preserved railroad station in Japan.

The station came under the aegis of the West Japan Railway Company (JR West) on 1 April 1987 due to the privatization of JNR. .

Station numbering was introduced in March 2018 with Nagahama being assigned station number JR-A09.

Passenger statistics
In fiscal 2019, the station was used by an average of 4391 passengers daily (boarding passengers only).

Gallery

Surrounding area
Nagahama City Office
Nagahama Castle (Nagahama Castle Historical Museum)
 Nagahama Port

See also
List of railway stations in Japan

References

External links

Nagahama Station (JR Odekake Net) 

Railway stations in Shiga Prefecture
Railway stations in Japan opened in 1882
Hokuriku Main Line
Nagahama, Shiga